The 1950 Wisconsin Badgers football team represented the University of Wisconsin in the 1950 Big Ten Conference football season. Led by second-year head coach Ivy Williamson, the Badgers compiled an overall record of 6–3 with a mark of 5–2 in conference play, tying for second place in the Big Ten. Bob Radcliffe was the team's MVP and Ken Huxhold was team's captain.

Schedule

References

Wisconsin
Wisconsin Badgers football seasons
Wisconsin Badgers football